Tribhuvan University Central Library (Tribhuvan Biswabidyalaya Kendriya Pustakalaya) is the largest public library in Nepal. It is operated by the Tribhuwan University and is located inside the Tribhuwan University campus at Kirtipur.

History 

In 1962, the Central Library of Lal Durbar (established 1957) was merged with the Tribhuvan University Library (established 1959) in accordance to the decision of HMG, Nepal and became Tribhuvan University Library. In 1977 (2033 BS) it was renamed Tribhuvan University Central Library. In 1959 the Central Library had about 1200 books donated by USAID.

Present day 
Currently, it hosts about 450,000 books. As of 2020, about 5000 people uses the library in daily basis. The library has a secure section that is not accessible to the general public. This section stores rare books that are over 300 years old.

The earthquake of 2015 damaged some books in the library.

Facilities and Services
 It issues ISBN numbers to the books published in Nepal. which was started from 2000.It started issuesing ISBN from online system from 2020.

See also
Nepal National Library
Tribhuwan University

References

External links 
official website
ISBN application

Libraries in Nepal
1959 establishments in Nepal